For Latvia and Ventspils (LuV) is a regionalist political party in Latvia that mainly operates as a localist party in Ventspils. It is mostly known for its chairman, Aivars Lembergs, who has been mayor of Ventspils between 1988 until his arrest in 2021. In 2006, the party signed an agreement with the Union of Greens and Farmers to allow members of For Latvia and Ventspils to be elected to the Saeima, including the former speaker of the parliament Gundars Daudze, and current members Dana Reizniece-Ozola and Jānis Vucāns. Since then, Lembergs has been named as a candidate for the position of the prime minister many times.

Electoral results

Ventspils local elections

Legislative elections

References

External links
Official website 

1994 establishments in Latvia
Political parties established in 1994
Political parties in Latvia